Zeena is a given name. Notable people with the name include:

Zeena Parkins (born 1956), American harpist
Zeena Schreck (born 1963), American artist and spiritual leader
Zeena Zaki (born 1974), Iraqi haute couture fashion designer
Zeena Khalaf (born 1977), Palestinian Pharmacist

Fictional characters:
Zeena (nickname for Zenobia), a character in the 1911 novel Ethan Frome
Zeena, one of the members of the Deadly Six in the video game Sonic Lost World

See also
Zenobia (disambiguation)
Xena
Xenia (disambiguation)
Zena (disambiguation)
Zenia (disambiguation)